Trimerotropis verruculata, known generally as the crackling forest grasshopper or cracker grasshopper, is a species of band-winged grasshopper in the family Acrididae. It is found in North America. Its names come from the distinctive cracking sound it makes as it flies.

Subspecies
These two subspecies belong to the species Trimerotropis verruculata:
 Trimerotropis verruculata suffusa Scudder, 1876 (crackling forest grasshopper)
 Trimerotropis verruculata verruculata (Kirby, 1837) (crackling locust)

References

External links

 

Oedipodinae
Articles created by Qbugbot
Insects described in 1837